is a Japanese Nippon Professional Baseball player for the Hokkaido Nippon-Ham Fighters in Japan's Pacific League.

External links

Living people
1981 births
People from Narita, Chiba
Baseball people from Chiba Prefecture
Toyo University alumni
Japanese baseball players
Nippon Professional Baseball infielders
Yomiuri Giants players
Hokkaido Nippon-Ham Fighters players